The rebel yell was a battle cry used by Confederate soldiers during the American Civil War.  Confederate soldiers used the yell when charging to intimidate the enemy and boost their own morale, although the yell had many other uses. There are audio clips and film footage of veterans performing the yell many years later at Civil War veterans' reunions. The origin of the yell is uncertain.

Sound 
The sound of the yell has been the subject of much discussion.  Civil War soldiers, upon hearing the yell from afar, would quip that it was either "Jackson, or a rabbit", suggesting a similarity between the sound of the yell and a rabbit's scream. The rebel yell has also been likened to the scream of a cougar. In media such as movies or video games, the yell is often portrayed as a simple "yee-haw" and in some parts of the United States, "yee-ha". The yell has also been described as similar to Native American cries.  John Salmon Ford, in an 1896 interview with Frederic Remington, describes a charge his Texas Rangers made into a Comanche village in 1858 and that his troops gave the "Texas Yell". One description says it was a cross between an "Indian whoop and wolf-howl".

Several recordings of Civil War veterans performing the yell exist. One, from a 1938 newsreel documenting the 75th anniversary of the Battle of Gettysburg, documents several Confederate veterans performing the yell as a high-pitched "Wa-woo-woohoo, wa-woo woohoo." The Library of Congress has a film from the 1930s of a dozen or so veterans performing the yell individually and as a group. In 1935, a 90 year-old North Carolina veteran was recorded performing it.

Units were nicknamed for their apparent ability to yell during battle. The 35th Battalion of Virginia Cavalry, "White's Cavalry", were given the nom de guerre of "Comanches" for the way they sounded in battle. Given the differences in descriptions of the yell, there might have been several distinctive yells associated with the different regiments and their respective geographical areas. However, in the documentary film Reconvergence, historian Waite Rawls, the head of the Museum of the Confederacy, describes his long odyssey to recover recordings of the yell. He found two historical recordings of two different soldiers from two different states (North Carolina infantry, and Virginia cavalry), and he claims they sound nearly identical.

Though hardly a definitive description, having been published some 70 years after the war ended, Margaret Mitchell's classic Civil War novel Gone with the Wind has a character giving the yell sounding as a "yee-aay-eee" upon hearing the war had started. The film version, by contrast, has the yell sounding as a high-pitched "yay-hoo" repeated several times in rapid succession.

In Ken Burns's documentary The Civil War, Shelby Foote notes that historians are not quite sure how the yell sounded, being described as "a foxhunt yip mixed up with sort of a banshee squall". He recounts the story of an old Confederate veteran invited to speak before a ladies' society dinner. They asked him for a demonstration of the rebel yell, but he refused on the grounds that it could only be done "at a run", and couldn't be done anyway with "a mouth full of false teeth and a stomach full of food". Anecdotes from former Union soldiers described the yell with reference to "a peculiar corkscrew sensation that went up your spine when you heard it" along with the comment that "if you claim you heard it and weren't scared that means you never heard it". In the final episode, a sound newsreel of a 1930s meeting of Civil War veterans has a Confederate veteran giving a Rebel yell for the occasion, sounding as a "wa-woo-woohoo".

In his autobiography My Own Story, Bernard Baruch recalls how his father, a former surgeon in the Confederate army, would at the sound of the song "Dixie" jump up and give the rebel yell, no matter where he was:  "As soon as the tune started Mother knew what was coming and so did we boys. Mother would catch him by the coattails and plead, 'Shush, Doctor, shush'. But it never did any good. I have seen Father, ordinarily a model of reserve and dignity, leap up in the Metropolitan Opera House and let loose that piercing yell."

Origins 
The yell has often been linked to Native American cries. Confederate soldiers may have imitated or learned the yell from Native Americans. Some Texas units mingled Comanche war whoops into their version of the yell.

Another claim is that it derived from the screams traditionally made by Irish and Scottish Highlanders when they made a Highland charge during battle. At the Battle of Killiecrankie "Dundee and the Chiefs chose to employ perhaps the most effective pre-battle weapon in the traditional (highland) arsenal – the eerie and disconcerting howl," also "The terror was heightened by their wild plaided appearance and the distinctive war-cry of the Gael – a high, savage whooping sound ..."

A final explanation, with special reference to the rebel yells uttered by the Army of Northern Virginia is that the rebel yell was partly adapted from the specialized cries used by men experienced in fox hunting. Sidney Lanier, the poet and Confederate veteran, described his unit's yell as "a single long cry as from the leader of a pack of hounds."

Considering the existence of many differing versions of the yell, it is possible that it had multiple origins.

Use of the "Southern war cry" precedes the Civil War. In the mid- to late-1850s in the Kansas Territory, "free-state" (meaning anti-slavery) forces battled against pro-slavery forces (as Kansas' determination on slavery was in violent dispute).  Sam Reeder was a "free-state" or "free-soil" combatant against a pro-slavery militia at the Battle of Hickory Point in September 1856.  "I could hear the sound of shots from the direction of Hickory Point, accompanied at intervals by fierce yells," remembered Reeder. "A young fellow near me remarked: 'Our men must be hitting them the way they holler.' It was not that; it was the ... Southern war cry."

One of the earliest accounts of the yell comes from the First Battle of Manassas (Bull Run) during then Brig. General Thomas Jonathan Stonewall Jackson's assault at Henry House Hill. An order was given during a bayonet charge to "yell like furies" in routing the Federal forces under General Irvin McDowell.

Contemporaneous accounts

In popular culture 
 Rebel Yell is the name of a brand of bourbon whiskey made in Kentucky. Billy Idol's song "Rebel Yell" was named after the whisky.
 Stan Freberg began his comedy recording of "The Yellow Rose of Texas" with his version of the rebel yell.
 An approximation of the yell can be heard in the 1951 film The Red Badge of Courage, starring Audie Murphy.
 In the civil war videogame War of Rights, when the Union team’s morale state is reduced, CSA troops will do the yell.

References

Sources 
 StonewallBrigade.com-Rebel Yell
Dwelly, E., (1973), The Illustrated Gaelic English Dictionary, 8th Edition, Gairm Publications, Glasgow.
Hill, J. M. (1986). Celtic Warfare 1595–1763. Edinburgh: John Donald Publishers Ltd.
MacLeod, J. (1996). Highlanders – A History of the Gaels. London: Hodder & Stoughton. .
McDonald, F., (1978), "The Ethnic Factor in Alabama History: A Neglected Dimension", Alabama Review, 31, pp. 256–65.
McDonald, F., & McDonald, E.S., (1980), "The Ethnic Origins of the American People, 1790", William & Mary Quarterly, 37, pp. 179–99.
McWhiney, Grady. 1965. "Who Whipped Whom? Confederate Defeat Re-examined". (Originally published in Civil War History, XI, No. 1 (March 1965) 5–26).  Essays on the Civil War and Reconstruction Ed. Erwin Unger.  Holt, Rinehart and Winston, Inc. New York.
Russell, W.H., (1863), My Diary North and South, T.O.H.P. Burnham, Boston.

Recordings 
 Actual recording of a rebel yell, performed by a veteran in 1935

 Rare Footage of Civil War Veterans Doing the Rebel Yell
 Civil war veteran soldier footage taken between 1913 and 1938

Confederate States Army
Cultural history of the American Civil War
Battle cries